Quesnelia arvensis is a species of bromeliad in the genus Quesnelia.

Distribution
This species is endemic to the Atlantic Forest ecoregion of southeastern Brazil.

It grows along the coast on moss and organic material in swampy forest areas, where it is shady, humid, and wet.

Description

The leaves are dark green and have a silver banding on the underside; the leaves are marked with conspicuous spines.

It grows a white stalk with a red bloom containing hidden blue petals.

References

arvensis
Endemic flora of Brazil
Flora of the Atlantic Forest
Flora of Paraná (state)
Flora of Rio de Janeiro (state)
Flora of São Paulo (state)